Thomas Platt may refer to:

Thomas C. Platt (1833–1910), US senator from New York
Thomas Collier Platt Jr. (1925–2017), United States federal judge in New York
Sir Thomas Joshua Platt (c. 1789–1862), British judge
Thomas Pell Platt (1798–1852), English orientalist
Tom Platt (born 1993), English footballer